Professor Armando Gálvez C. served as the National Executive Commissioner of the Asociación de Scouts de Guatemala.

In 1974, he was awarded the 85th Bronze Wolf, the only distinction of the World Organization of the Scout Movement, awarded by the World Scout Committee for exceptional services to world Scouting.

References

External links

Recipients of the Bronze Wolf Award
Scouting and Guiding in Guatemala
Possibly living people
Year of birth missing